Casa Colorada (English: Red House) is a colonial house built located in Santiago, Chile. It was built in 1769, by Joseph de la Vega for Mateo de Toro y Zambrano, and currently houses the Museo de Santiago (English: Museum of Santiago). The house has a clay-tiled roof, balconied windows, and deep-red walls, and consists of two storeys.

Visitors walk through the homes two large patios to get the Museo de Santiago, which occupies five of Casa Colorada's rooms. The museum explores Santiago's history from the Pre-Columbian era to contemporary times.

References

Buildings and structures in Santiago
Houses completed in 1769
Museums in Santiago, Chile
History museums in Chile
City museums in Chile
Houses in Chile